Lu Yen-hsun won the final 6–2, 3–6, 6–1 against Jürgen Zopp.

Seeds

Draw

Finals

Top half

Bottom half

References
 Main Draw
 Qualifying Draw

Ningbo Challenger - Singles
2011 Men's Singles